Attilio Veraldi (1925–1999) was an Italian novelist and translator.

Biography 
Born in Naples, Veraldi started his career as a translator of hardboiled American novels. He made his writing debut in 1976, with the giallo novel La mazzetta, which enjoyed an immediate critical and commercial and was later adapted into a film, The Payoff. He is regarded as an original innovator in the giallo genre, being noted for his ironic approach as well as for his realistic portrays of the Neapolitan Camorra underworld and terrorist circles, and as the inspirator of a wave of Neapolitan giallo novelists.

Novels 
     La mazzetta (1976)
     Uomo di conseguenza (1978)
     Il vomerese (1980)
     Naso di cane (1982)
     L'amica degli amici (1984)
     Donna da Quirinale (1990)
     Scicco (1991)
     L'ombra dell'avventura (1992)

References

External links 

 Profile at Gialli.it
  

1925 births
1999 deaths
Writers from Naples
Italian male novelists
Italian mystery writers
20th-century Italian writers
20th-century Italian male writers
20th-century Italian translators